Jorge Eduardo Romero is a retired football referee from Argentina. He is known for having refereed matches at the FIFA World Youth Championship, the 1984 Summer Olympics and many more international matches in South American competitions.

References

Argentine football referees
Living people
Year of birth missing (living people)